The 1964 AFC Asian Cup was the 3rd edition of the men's AFC Asian Cup, a quadrennial international football tournament organised by the Asian Football Confederation (AFC). The finals were held in Israel from 26 May to 3 June 1964.

The tournament used a round-robin system with the winners from the West, Central 1 and 2 and East Asia zones and the team from the host nation (Israel) competing for the title. 11 of the 17 nations withdrew with the result that only one zone (combined Central 1 and 2) played any qualifying matches and the winners of 2 zones and host Israel qualified uncontested. Israel won the title with three wins.

Venues

Qualification

Squads

Results

Note: All the games lasted 80 minutes.

Winners

Goalscorers 

With two goals, Inder Singh and Mordechai Spiegler were the top scorers in the tournament. In total, 13 goals were scored by 11 different players, with none of them credited as own goal.

2 goals

 Inder Singh
 Mordechai Spiegler

1 goal

  Cheung Yiu Kwok
  K. Appalaraju
  Chuni Goswami
  Sukumar Samajpati
  Yohai Aharoni
  Moshe Leon
  Gideon Tish
  Park Seoung-ok
  Lee Soon-Myung

Notes

References

External links
 Korean scorers 
 Details at RSSSF

 
May 1964 sports events in Asia
June 1964 sports events in Asia
AFC Asian Cup tournaments

AFC
AFC Asian Cup
International association football competitions hosted by Israel
1964 in Israeli sport